Thomas William Porter (born Thomas William Potter; 2 August 1843 – 12 November 1920) was a New Zealand soldier and land purchase officer.

 
He was born in Streatham, Surrey, England in 1843. He married Herewaka Porourangi Potai. Their children included the singer and composer Fanny Rose Howie and their grandchildren included Rona Hurley.

He was some time, before retiring in 1908, Acting Undersecretary for Defense. He was also vice-chairman of the Historical Section of the Wellington Philosophical Society. He was the author of a book on the East Coast Maori legends. He also completed a history of the Maori war with Te Kooti.

In 1878 he was elected mayor of Gisborne. He was re-elected unopposed in 1879 and 1880. He had intended to contest the  electorate in the  but pulled out shortly before. In 1880 he was challenged for the mayoralty by former mayor William Fitzgerald Crawford, and won by just three votes. He returned to the mayoralty unopposed in 1883. He retired again in 1884 and endorsed recently defeated MP Cecil de Lautour for the mayoralty. He was elected mayor again in 1886 following the resignation of Allan McDonald.

The day before his death on 12 November 1920, parliament had passed a bill to award Porter with a permanent pension of £200 a year.

See also  
List of New Zealand units in the Second Boer War

References

External links
  Obituary, Transactions and proceedings of the New Zealand Institute v. 53 (1920)

1843 births
1920 deaths
Mayors of Gisborne, New Zealand
New Zealand military personnel
People from Surrey
English emigrants to New Zealand
Unsuccessful candidates in the 1881 New Zealand general election